The 2019 WAFL Women's season was the inaugural season of the WAFL Women's (WAFLW). The season commenced on 5 May and concluded with the Grand Final on 14 September 2019. The competition was contested by five clubs, all of whom were affiliated with men's clubs from the West Australian Football League (WAFL).

Clubs

Ladder

Finals series

Qualifying and Elimination finals

Preliminary final

Grand Final

References